Llanquihue may refer to:
Lake Llanquihue, the second largest lake in Chile
Llanquihue Province, a province of Chile located in the southern Los Lagos Region
Llanquihue, Chile, a Chilean commune and city in Llanquihue Province, Los Lagos Region
Llanquihue River, a river in the commune of Panguipulli, southern Chile